The Dark Tale, is a 1991 Italian thriller film written and directed by Roberto Leoni and produced by Giulio Scanni starring John Savage.

Plot 
On a desert island where she stays with her sister Beatrice and her nanny Martina, Angelica wishes she could have a handsome prince to play with. Not far from the island, a terrorist named Roy escapes while being transported between two prisons by boat. Together with the policeman he is handcuffed to, Roy is found by Angelica, who takes care of him, sure that he is her "handsome prince". The policeman falls into the sea and Beatrice and Martina die after strange accidents. Roy finally realizes that Angelica has killed them so that she can be alone with her "handsome prince". He trips and gets knocked out, and when he wakes up he finds he is bound and gagged. He meets an unpleasant fate.

Cast 
 John Savage as Roy Kramer
 Claudia Gerini as Beatrice

References

External links 
 

1991 films
Italian thriller films
English-language Italian films
Films set in the United States
Films scored by Luis Bacalov
1991 thriller films
1990s English-language films
1990s Italian films